St. Michael's Church is a historic Roman Catholic church located in Anjuna, Goa state, India.

It is one of the oldest churches still standing in Goa.  It was built in 1613, to serve Goan Catholics in early colonial Portuguese India.

See also

Goa Inquisition
Persecution of Goan Catholics during the Goan Inquisition

References

Sources

Colonial Goa
Roman Catholic churches in Goa
15th-century Roman Catholic church buildings in India
Religious buildings and structures completed in 1613
1610s establishments in Portuguese India
Portuguese colonial architecture in India
1613 establishments in the Portuguese Empire
Churches in North Goa district